Pisidium personatum is a species of freshwater bivalve from the family Sphaeriidae.

Description
The 2.5-3.5 mm shell is a characteristic round-regular oval shape. It has centrally placed low, rounded umbos. The surface (periostracum) is dull or silky with very fine irregular concentric striations. The colour is yellowish to greyish but it is invariably coated in a red-brown to dark brown deposit.

Distribution
Its native distribution is European-Siberian.

 Czech Republic – in Bohemia, in Moravia, least concern (LC)
 Germany – distributed in all of Germany but in 5 states in red list (Rote Liste BRD).
 Nordic countries: Denmark, Faroes, Finland (near threatened), Iceland, Norway and Sweden
Great Britain and Ireland

References

External links
Pisidium personatum at Animalbase taxonomy,short description, biology,status (threats), images
Images at BOLD.
 Pisidium personatum illustrated in Danmarks Fauna (Georg Mandahl-Barth)

personatum
Bivalves described in 1855